The Michigan Wolverines Sports Network is an American radio network consisting of 46 radio stations which carry coverage of Michigan Wolverines football and men's basketball. WXYT-FM (97.1 FM) and  WWJ (950 AM), both in Metro Detroit, serve as the network's flagship stations.  The network also includes 44 affiliates in the U.S. states of Michigan and Ohio: 27 AM stations, four of which extend their signals with low-power FM translators; and 17 full-power FM stations ( Toledo generally only broadcasts Michigan content over its HD Radio digital subchannel). Games are also available on Sirius XM satellite radio and online via TuneIn.

Announcers

Football
Doug Karsch does play-by-play and Jon Jansen does color commentary for football.

Basketball
Brian Boesch currently serves as play-by-play announcer for men's basketball, joined by color analyst Terry Mills.

History
Michigan's relationship with IMG College dates back to March 2001 when the school signed a five-year deal with Host Communications, Inc., a sports marketing firm based in Lexington, Kentucky; the deal was predicated to generate $7.5 million in advertising revenue from Michigan football and men's basketball radio broadcasts through 2005–06 (this partnership with Host would ultimately remain in place for the next seven years).  In 2007, IMG College purchased Host Communications; in August 2008, IMG announced a new 12-year media rights deal with Michigan reportedly worth $86 million, including gameday radio broadcasts.

WJR/Detroit had served as the network flagship station for Michigan football since 1976 (with sister station CKLW serving as backup for those times when Detroit Tigers baseball games took precedence) and men's basketball since 1997.  In October 2005, WJR announced a new deal to broadcast rival Michigan State football and men's basketball, while simultaneously dropping its long partnership with Michigan.  The news came as a surprise to the Michigan athletic department, including director Bill Martin, who claimed the school had acted "in good faith" throughout months of negotiations with the station.  Michigan soon signed a new five-year deal with CBS Radio and CHUM Limited (later CTVglobemedia), owners of WOMC/Detroit and CKLW/Windsor, respectively.  In August 2011, new Michigan athletic director Dave Brandon announced a five-year contract extension with CBS Radio, with the majority of network flagship coverage shifting to WOMC AM sister station WWJ.

Station list

Gray background indicates low-power translator
* football only
** men's basketball only

Network map(s)

References

External links
Michigan football affiliates
Michigan men's basketball affiliates
IMGCollege.com: University of Michigan

College basketball on the radio in the United States
College football on the radio
Michigan Wolverines football
Michigan Wolverines men's basketball
Sports radio networks in the United States